Jonuz is a surname. Notable people with the surname include:

Mirsad Jonuz (born 1962), Macedonian footballer and coach
Jonuz Kaceli (1908–1951), Albanian businessman and dissident

See also
Jonas (name)

Albanian masculine given names